Madhava is one of the primary epithets of Vishnu and his avatar Krishna. The word Mādhava in Sanskrit is a vṛddhi derivation of the word Madhu, which means honey. It is a title of Krishna, referring to his lineage as 'he who appeared the Madhu dynasty'.

In the Bhagavad Gita, Arjuna addresses Krishna as Madhava (meaning "lord of fortune"; not to confused with a secondary name, Madhusudana, which means "slayer of the demon Madhu").

According to Adi Shankara's commentary on the Vishnu Sahasranama and the Narada Pancharatra, Madhava means the consort (dhava) of the mother (ma), referring to Lakshmi, the goddess called the 'mother of the universe'. Alternatively, it means the 'one who is fit to be known through Madhu-vidya', or can mean the 'one who is the lord of ma, or knowledge.

Literature 
In the Skanda Purana, Shiva mentions Madhava as an epithet of Vishnu, described as the one who holds the conch, discus and mace.

In the Garuda Purana, the hymn to Vishnu composed by Markandeya includes the verse, "I crave the mercy of Madhava and of Janardana, what shall Death do unto me?"

In the Harivamsa Purana, during the episode of Krishna's elopement with Princess Rukmini, the epithet is mentioned during his battle against Rukmi:

See also 
Govinda
Keshava
Gopala-Krishna

References

 Cited from Sri Vishnu Sahasranama, commentary by Sri Sankaracharya, translated by Swami Tapasyananda, available at Sri Ramakrishna Math, Chennai.  

Titles and names of Krishna
Forms of Krishna